The Judicial Officers Recommendation Commission (JORC) is a statutory body in Hong Kong responsible for advising and making recommendations to the Chief Executive on judicial appointments and related matters established after the Handover in accordance with the Judicial Officers Recommendation Commission Ordinance (Cap. 92). According to Article 88 of the Basic Law, the Chief Executive shall appoint judges on the recommendation of the Commission, suggesting that she is not empowered to make appointments on her own accord.

The Commission is chaired by the Chief Justice of the Court of Final Appeal ex-officio and is composed of the Secretary for Justice ex-officio and 7 other members appointed by the Chief Executive, including two judges, a barrister (typically recommended by the Hong Kong Bar Association), a solicitor (typically recommended by the Law Society of Hong Kong), and three other persons not connected with the practice of law. Resolutions of the Commission are effective upon a quorum of 7 members, of which at least two less than the number present must vote in favor. No member has veto power.

Current members 

 The Hon Mr Justice Andrew Cheung Kui-nung, Chairperson ex-officio as Chief Justice of the Court of Final Appeal
 The Hon Paul Lam SC, ex-officio as Secretary for Justice
 The Hon Mr Justice Jeremy Poon Shiu-chor, Chief Judge of the High Court
 The Hon Madam Justice Carlye Chu Fun-ling, Vice President of the Court of Appeal
 Victor Dawes SC, Chairman of the Hong Kong Bar Association
 Melissa Kaye Pang, Former President of the Law Society 
 Anita Fung Yuen-mei, former Chief Executive of the Hongkong Shanghai Banking Corporation
 Pamela Chan Wong-shui, former Chief Executive of the Hong Kong Consumer Council
 Liu Pak-wai, Professor of Economics at the Chinese University of Hong Kong

References

Hong Kong legal professionals
Statutory bodies in Hong Kong